Margaret Robinson is a Canadian Mi’kmaq feminist scholar and activist noted for her research on sexuality, specifically bisexuality, sexual and gender minority people's experiences of mental health and Indigenous health.  She is currently an assistant professor at Dalhousie University.

Biography
Robinson received a M.A. in Theology in 2001 and a Ph.D in Theology in 2009, both from the University of Toronto. She was a past co-chair of the Dyke March, project coordinator of the Risk & Resilience project, and project lead for the Bisexuality Disclosure Kit. She is a vegan and presents at conferences and community events on Indigenous veganism.

Career
Recent publications on bisexuality and mental health include bisexual women's use of cannabis, the experiences of bisexual people in seeking mental health supports, and bisexuality, poverty and mental health.
From 2014 to 2016 Robinson was the Researcher in Residence in Indigenous Health at the Ontario HIV Treatment Network in Toronto. Robinson has received numerous fellowships and major grants, including a 2015 Canada Council for the Arts grant for Aboriginal Writing used towards a residency at the Banff Centre. In 2017, Robinson was appointed vice-chair of the Canadian Institute of Health Research's Indigenous Health Advisory Board.

Activism
In 2011, Robinson was the Project Coordinator of the "This is Our Community" poster and postcard campaign, developed with Rainbow Health Ontario in order to challenge biphobia. The project, which consisted of 4 posters featuring identities "erased" via biphobia (such as bisexual and femme, bisexual and Black, bisexual and trans) received international attention, including coverage in The Advocate.  She is a former facilitator with both the Toronto Bisexual Network and Bisexual Women of Toronto groups, as well as director of the Toronto Bisexuality Education Project.

References

External links
 Dalhousie University: Margaret Robinson, Department of Sociology and Social Anthropology

Living people
Writers from Nova Scotia
Canadian LGBT rights activists
Canadian activists
Bisexual rights activists
Bisexual women
Mi'kmaq people
First Nations women writers
First Nations activists
LGBT First Nations people
First Nations feminists
21st-century Canadian women writers
Canadian women activists
21st-century First Nations writers
21st-century Canadian non-fiction writers
Canadian women non-fiction writers
Year of birth missing (living people)
Bisexual academics
First Nations academics
Women civil rights activists
Canadian bisexual writers
21st-century Canadian LGBT people
Canadian LGBT academics